Benjamin Griffey (born 25 September 1982), better known by his stage name Casper, is a German American rapper signed to Sony Music.

Early life
Casper was born in Lemgo in North Rhine-Westphalia to a German mother and an American father, Arlen Griffey, who was a soldier stationed in Lemgo. His family moved to Augusta, Georgia, in the United States, when he was two weeks old, where he lived in a trailer park. At the age of 11, he moved back to Germany and settled in Bielefeld with his mother and younger sister. Despite his mother being German, he had not been raised bilingually and therefore struggled at school initially.

Career
Casper was involved in many studio recordings with other German rappers, such as Abroo and Separate. Together they founded the hip-hop group Kinder des Zorns. In 2004, they released Rap Art War, their first and only album.

In 2006, he released a mixtape called Die Welt hört mich with the label 667 - One More Than the Devil. In the two years following the release of Die Welt hört mich, he toured through Germany, and on 9 May 2008, he released his first album, Hin zur Sonne via the 667 record label.

In February 2009, he left 667 Records and signed a contract with Selfmade Records. Together with Kollegah, Favorite and Shiml, who were also signed to Selfmade Records, they released Chronik 2 in April 2009.

In October 2010, Casper left Selfmade Records and signed a new contract with Four Music. His second album, XOXO, was released on 8 July 2011.

Casper is known for his slightly hoarse sounding voice: this was as a result of him having played in punk/hardcore bands in the early days of his music career which resulted in some damage to his vocal cords.

Reception in the German rap scene

Casper has often been labelled as an "emo rapper", which he also uses to describe himself, stating that he was fed up of being asked about his style. His lyrics are mainly autobiographical, in particular in the song "Hin zur Sonne", describing his early life in America.

Discography
Albums
 2008: Hin zur Sonne
 2011: XOXO
 2013: Hinterland
 2017: Lang lebe der Tod
 2018: 1982 together with Marteria
 2022: Alles war schön und nichts tat weh

Mixtapes
 2006: Die Welt hört mich
 2007: Exclusive Mixtape (online mixtape)

EPs
 2003: Grundstein
 2011: Auf und davon - EP

Freetracks
 2006: Kann nicht verlieren
 2006: Sie lieben mich jetzt
 2007: Party wie die Rockstars
 2008: Nie wieder (feat. Prinz Pi)
 2011: Nie Wieder (Akustik Version) (feat. Prinz Pi)
 2012: Nie Auf (with Cro feat. Timid Tiger)
 2012: Halbe Mille

Collaborations
 2004: Rap Art War (Kinder des Zorns album)
 2009: Chronik 2 - sampler with Kollegah, Shiml and Favorite
 2018: 1982 - album with Marteria

Singles
 2009: Herz aus Holz 2009
 2009: Mittelfinger hoch feat. Kollegah, Shiml and Favorite
 2011: So perfekt
 2011: Michael X
 2011: Auf und davon
 2013: Im Ascheregen
 2013: Hinterland
 2013: Jambalaya
 2014: Alles endet (aber nie die Musik)
 2016: Lang lebe der Tod feat. Blixa Bargeld, Dagobert & Sizarr
 2017: Keine Angst feat. Drangsal
 2017: Alles ist erleuchtet
 2018: Champion Sound with Marteria
 2018: Supernova with Marteria
 2018: Chardonnay & Purple Haze with Marteria

Trivia
 Casper is a fan of the football club Arminia Bielefeld. His song "Eines Tages" is dedicated to Arminia Bielefeld.
 In the 1LIVE Schulduell (School duel), the winning school, Geschwister-Scholl-Gymnasium in Düsseldorf, won an exclusive concert with Casper.

References

1982 births
German rappers
Living people